Quand les hommes pleurent (English: When Men Cry) is a 1999 documentary film directed by Yasmine Kassari.

The director spent a summer in the region of Murcia alongside the clandestine workers featured in her documentary. Poems of the Palestinian Mahmoud Darwich are scattered throughout the film. It was screened at a number of international film festivals.

Synopsis 
The film follows "men who cry", Moroccan workers who have crossed the Strait of Gibraltar in order to reach Spain, in search of a better future. These migrants soon discover the impasse in which they find themselves, stuck there in living conditions worse than those they knew at home.

References 

1999 documentary films
Belgian documentary films
Moroccan diaspora in Europe
Migrant workers
Demographics of Spain